Adiantum cuneatum can refer to:

Adiantum cuneatum G.Forst., a synonym of Lindsaea trichomanoides Dryand.
Adiantum cuneatum Langsd. & Fisch., a synonym of Adiantum raddianum C.Presl